Gilles Wach (born Troyes, 26 November 1956) is a French-Gabonese Roman Catholic priest, co-founder and Prior General of the Institute of Christ the King Sovereign Priest, a Traditionalist society of apostolic life of pontifical right.

Ecclesiastical career
After finishing secondary school, he entered the seminary of Paray-le-Monial, where he did a year of formation. He moved to the seminary of the Diocese of Genoa, where he met Philippe Mora, who would be his friend and co-founder of the Institute of Christ the King Sovereign Priest. He was ordained a deacon by Cardinal Giuseppe Siri on 29 June 1978, and a priest by Pope John Paul II, on 24 June 1979, among other 24 deacons, including his friend Philippe Mora. He pursued his studies in Rome, residing at the Pontifical Irish College while studying for his doctorate in Theology at the Pontifical University of Saint Thomas Aquinas, with his thesis on St. Francis of Sales, Pédagogie de l'amour. L'éducation de la charité chez saint Francois. During this time, he worked with Cardinal Silvio Oddi, then Prefect of the Congregation for the Clergy. He joined the Traditionalist Opus Sacerdotale, a priestly association led by Abbé Pierre Lourdelet, at the late 1980s, and he played an important role in the foundation of the Opus Sacerdotale in Moissac.

Wach was nominated Vicar General of the Diocese of Mouila, in Gabon, on 19 June 1989, by Cyriaque Obamba, which he was until 1995, when he became Vicar General emeritus.

He founded the Institute of Christ the King Sovereign Priest with Philippe Mora in 1990, a society of apostolic life, which was granted pontifical right in 2008. The ICKSP celebrates primarily the Extraordinary Form of the Roman Rite. He has been Prior General of the ICKSP since its inception until 2008, when he was elected for a six-year term. He was reelected for another six-year term in November 2014. He was elected for a third six-year term on 24 August 2020.

References

1956 births
Living people
Clergy from Troyes
20th-century French Roman Catholic priests
French traditionalist Catholics
Traditionalist Catholic priests
21st-century French Roman Catholic priests